Nae is both a surname and a given name. It may refer to:

Surname:

 Eugen Nae (born 1974), Romanian footballer
 Marius Nae (born 1981), Romanian footballer

Given name:

 Nae Caranfil (born 1960), Romanian film director and screenwriter
 Nae Ionescu (1890–1940), Romanian philosopher, logician, mathematician, academic, writer and journalist

See also
 NAE (disambiguation)